XHSDM-FM is a radio station on 95.7 FM in Santo Domingo, located in the municipality of Ocosingo, Chiapas. It is part of the state-owned Radio Chiapas state network and is known as La Voz de la Selva.

XHSDM signed on in January 2000.

References

Radio stations in Chiapas
Public radio in Mexico